Gerard van Bohemen is a New Zealand Judge and a former Permanent Representative of New Zealand to the United Nations (UN) in New York.

Van Bohemen received degrees in English and law from Victoria University of Wellington. He worked in private law practices in Wellington and Auckland and from 2005 to 2010 was Director of the Legal Division of the Ministry of Foreign Affairs and Trade and New Zealand's International Legal Adviser. Prior to becoming the Permanent Representative to the UN, van Bohemen was a Deputy Secretary of the Ministry. Since 2011, he has also been New Zealand's Commissioner to the International Whaling Commission.

During July 2015 and September 2016, van Bohemen was the President of the UN Security Council.

On 14 July 2017, it was announced that van Bohemen would be appointed a Justice of High Court of New Zealand.

References

Notes

References
"New Permanent Representative of New Zealand Presents Credentials", UN Doc BIO/4726, 11 May 2015.
Jo Moir, "New Zealand's top UN diplomat and his posh New York apartment", stuff.co.nz, 26 June 2015.

20th-century New Zealand lawyers
Permanent Representatives of New Zealand to the United Nations
Victoria University of Wellington alumni
Living people
New Zealand public servants
Year of birth missing (living people)
21st-century New Zealand judges